The Star of South Africa, post-nominal letters SSA, is a military decoration for merit which was instituted by the Union of South Africa from 1952 to 1975. It was awarded to general and flag officers of the South African Defence Force for exceptionally meritorious service. The Star of South Africa was discontinued on 1 July 1975, when a new set of orders, decorations and medals was instituted.

The South African military
The Union Defence Forces (UDF) were established in 1912, and renamed the South African Defence Force (SADF) in 1958. On 27 April 1994, it was integrated with six other independent forces into the South African National Defence Force (SANDF).

Institution
The Star of South Africa, post-nominal letters SSA, was introduced by Queen Elizabeth II on 6 April 1952, during the Tercentenary Van Riebeeck Festival. It was formally instituted by the Queen on 26 January 1953.

The decoration was named after the first large diamond to be found in South Africa, the Star of South Africa, which was found on the banks of the Orange River in 1869, which sparked the New Rush, leading to the establishment of Kimberley, the capital and largest city of Northern Cape Province in South Africa

Award criteria
The Star of South Africa was awarded to general and flag officers for exceptionally meritorious service. In effect, it took the place of the Commander of the Order of the British Empire (CBE), which had been awarded to senior South African officers during World War II.

Order of wear

With effect from 6 April 1952, when the Star of South Africa and several other new decorations and medals were instituted, these new awards took precedence before all earlier  British decorations and medals awarded to South Africans, with the exception of the Victoria Cross, which still took precedence before all other awards. The other older British awards continued to be worn in the order prescribed by the British Central Chancery of the Orders of Knighthood.

The position of the Star of South Africa in the official order of precedence was revised three times after 1975, to accommodate the inclusion or institution of new decorations and medals, upon the integration into the South African National Defence Force in 1994, when decorations and medals were belatedly instituted in April 1996 for the two former non-statutory forces, the Azanian People's Liberation Army and Umkhonto we Sizwe, and again when a new series of military decorations and medals was instituted in South Africa on 27 April 2003.

South African Defence Force until 26 April 1994
  
Official SADF order of precedence:
 Preceded by the Star of South Africa, Silver (SSAS).
 Succeeded by the Louw Wepener Decoration (LWD).
Official national order of precedence:
 Preceded by the Order of Good Hope Class III, Commander.
 Succeeded by the Decoration for Meritorious Service (DMS).

South African National Defence Force from 27 April 1994
  
Official SANDF order of precedence:
 Preceded by the Order of the Leopard, Military Division, Commander of the Republic of Bophuthatswana.
 Succeeded by the Louw Wepener Decoration (LWD) of the Republic of South Africa.
Official national order of precedence:
 Preceded by the Order of Good Hope Class III, Commander of the Republic of South Africa.
 Succeeded by the Decoration for Meritorious Service (DMS) of the Republic of South Africa.

South African National Defence Force from 27 April 2003
  
Official SANDF order of precedence:
 Preceded by the Order of the Leopard, Military Division, Commander of the Republic of Bophuthatswana.
 Succeeded by the Louw Wepener Decoration (LWD) of the Republic of South Africa.
Official national order of precedence:
 Preceded by the Companion of O.R. Tambo, Bronze of the Republic of South Africa.
 Succeeded by the Decoration for Meritorious Service (DMS) of the Republic of South Africa.

Description
Obverse
The Star of South Africa was struck in silver and consists of eight five-pointed stars of differing sizes, superimposed on each other, to fit into a 50 millimetres diameter circle.

Reverse
The reverse has the pre-1994 South African Coat of Arms. Specimens which were minted and awarded before South Africa became a republic on 31 May 1961, have Queen Elizabeth's royal cipher (E II R) above the Coat of Arms.

Ribbon
 
The decoration is worn around the neck on an orange ribbon, 44 millimetres wide, with three green bands in the centre, all 3 millimetres wide and spaced 6 millimetres apart.

Discontinuation
Conferment of the decoration was discontinued in respect of services performed on or after 1 July 1975, when the Order of the Star of South Africa was instituted.

In 1977, recipients of the Star of South Africa of 1952 were promoted to the new Order of the Star of South Africa, by being presented with the Star of South Africa, Gold in substitution of their existing decorations.

One documented example is Lieutenant General Colin Cockcroft , whose 1952 decoration (no. 38) was replaced by the Star of South Africa, Gold (no. 5) on 15 April 1977.

Another example is General Magnus Malan , whose photograph alongside shows him wearing the Star of South Africa, Gold around his neck as well as the miniature on his chest, while the main picture at the top of this page shows the Star of South Africa of 1952 named to him.

Recipients

References

Military decorations and medals of South Africa
1952 establishments in South Africa
Awards established in 1952